Shenphen Rinpoche (born Ronan Chatellier in France) is the spiritual teacher of Buddhist Congregation Dharmaling.

References 

Living people
Tibetan Buddhists from Slovenia
Rinpoches
Year of birth missing (living people)